The American Romanian Academy of Arts and Sciences (ARA) is a scholarly organization dedicated to the analysis, study and dissemination of Romanian contributions and accomplishments. To enhance these efforts, ARA combines Western and Romanian intellectual traditions, encourages communications and serves as a point d'appui in the Western World for Romanian academics and intellectuals. ARA is duly incorporated in the State of California as a non-profit tax-exempt organization. It is organized in conformity with the pertinent laws and regulations of the state of California and the United States of America. ARA conducts and supports multidisciplinary studies in exact sciences, mathematics, natural sciences, and also supports the arts, linguistics, literature, political studies and sociology. As an institution its main goal is to foster cultural exchanges between the American and Romanian cultures. ARA was founded in California in 1975 by a group of American-Romanians, and in 2014 has 119 elected members, 81 corresponding members, and 59 honorary members.

ARA organizes annual congresses, and publishes ARA Congress Proceedings, books and the ARA Newsletter for its membership.

The Romanian branch of ARA has its center in Timișoara, Romania, that is closely coordinated with the US main organization.

Areas of interest
ARA is supporting specific research activities in the following areas:

Anthropology, Applied Mathematics, Biology, Chemistry, Economy, Education, Engineering, Environment, History, Law, Linguistics,  Literature, Medical Informatics, Medicine, Political Science, Philosophy, Physics, Theology.

Educational activities
ARA Congress: Every year, ARA organizes a Congress that provides an open forum for intellectuals to present their ideas and achievements in fields such as literature, philosophy, medicine, social sciences, arts, engineering, mathematics, physics, and chemistry etc. The highlight of the annual congress is its Proceedings which is published on an annual basis.

ARA Publisher: Started in 2014, ARA Publisher is the Publishing House of the American Romanian Academy of Arts and Sciences.

ARA President 
Prof. Ruxandra VIDU - USA: 2013–2017, re-elected 2017-2021

ARA    EMERITUS PRESIDENTS

1. Dr. Mgr. Octavian BÂRLEA            -  Germany, ARA President: 1975-1978

2. Prof. Nicolae TIMIRAȘ                    - USA, ARA President: 1978-1982

3. Prof. Maria MANOLIU-MANEA        - USA, ARA President: 1982-1995

4. Prof. Constantin CORDUNEANU    - USA, ARA President: 1995-1998

5. Prof. Ion PARASCHIVOIU               - Canada, ARA President: 1998-2013

Honorary Members
The list of ARA Honorary Members includes: Nobel Laureate George Palade (CA, USA), King Michael I of Romania, former Governor Michael Dukakis (CA, USA), Prof. Mircea Eliade (IL, USA), former Ambassador David Britton Funderbruk (USA) in Romania, Ambassador John R. Davis (USA),  Eugène Ionesco (France), Prof. Dr. Emil Constantinescu (Third President of free Romania from 1996 to 2000), Prof. Nicolaie Georgescu (Chancellor of Alma Mater University in Sibiu, Romania), former Romanian Ambassador—Acad. Virgil Constantinescu, Prof.Alain Bezançon (France), Prof. Michel Meslin (France), Professor Emil Turdeanu(Sorbonne, France), Prof. Raghu S. Ragunathan (UK), Prof. Jacques Bouchard (decorated with the Order of Canada), Prof. Nicolas Mateesco-Matte, Academician, Prof. Jean D.A. Bozet (Belgium), Prof. Willy P.J. Legros (Belgium), Prof. Teodoro Oniga (Brazil), Romanian Academicians Augustin Buzura, Eugen Simion, Gabriel Țepelea, and Education Minister, Acad. Mircea Malița (also former Romanian Ambassador in USA and Switzerland), Acad. Prof. Grigore Belostecinic (Republic of Moldova), Acad. Prof. Andrei Andrieș, (Republic of Moldova), Reverend Gheorghe Calciu-Dumitreasa (USA), Prof. Ladis K. Kristof (CA, USA), Prof. Adrian Bejan (USA), Prof. Paul Ricœur (USA), Acad.Prof. Radu Roșca (France), Lieutenant-General Prof. Teodor Frunzeti (Romania), Prof. Claudiu Matasa (USA), together with 10 other members of a total of 42 Honorary members worldwide.

Emeriti ARA Members
Acad. Alexandru BALABAN - Texas, USA, 2013, Prof. Raymonde A. BULGER, USA, 1998 (n. 13 July 1921 – d. 3 February 2014), Dr. Nicolas CATANOY, Germany, 1998, Prof. Dr. Charles Merritt CARLTON (n. 12 December 1928 - d. 9 March 2008), Dr. Pavel CHIHAIA, Germany, 1998, Prof. Aurel CIUFECU, USA, 1998 (n. October 18, 1922 - d. May 23, 2011), Prof. Dr. Ioan DAVID, Prof. Domnita DUMITRESCU, 2014, Dr. Radu ENESCU, Spain, 1998, Prof. Radu FLORESCU, USA, 1998 (n. October 24, 1925 - d. May 18, 2014), Acad. Dinu GIURESCU, USA, 1998 (n. 15 February 1927 – d. 24 April 2018), Prof. Monica-Anca GRECU, 2014, Prof. Ladis K. KRISTOF, USA, 1998 (n. November 26, 1918 -d.  June 15, 2010), Prof. Dr. Ing. Adriana NASTASE - Germany, 2013, Mr. George Roca - Sydney, Australia, 2013, Dr. Carmen SABAU, USA, 1998, Dr. Mircea Sabau, USA, 1998 (n. 24 August 1934, Turda - d. 15 Iunie 2009), Prof. Paola TIMIRAS, USA, 1998 (July 21, 1923 – September 12, 2008), Dr. Dino TUDOR, 2014, Prof. Cezar VASILIU, Prof. Lory WALLFISH, USA, 1998 (April 21, 1922 - September 18, 2011)

Latest the most recent ARA Congresses
41st Congress 2017, July 19–22, 2017, University of Craiova, Romania, Chairman: Prof. Dr. Eng. Ruxandra Botez

40th Congress 2016, July 28 - August 31, 2016, Montreal, Canada, Chairman: Dr. Ala Mindicanu

39th Congress 2015, July 28 - August 31, 2015, National Institute of Nuclear Physics, Frascati, Roma, Chairman: Dr. Catalina Curceanu

38th Congress 2014, July 23–27, 2014, Caltech, Pasadena, CA, Chairman: Dr. Adrian Stoica

37th Congress 2013, June 4–9, 2016, Universitatea de Studii Politice si Economice Europene "Constantin Stere" Chisinau, Republic of Moldova, HONORARY PRESIDENTS: Prof. Dr. Ing. Ion Paraschivoiu, ARA President, and Prof. Dr. Gheorghe Avornic, Rector of USPEE. Chairman - Vice-chancellor Vlaicu Vlad, www.uspee.md, Photos from the 37th Congress 2013

36th Congress 2012, May 29 - June 3, 2012, Libera Università Mediterranea Jean Monnet, Bari, Italy, Honorary Chairman - Prof. Emanuele DEGENNARO, Rector of LUM Jean Monnet, Chairman - Dr. Domenico MORRONE

35th Congress 2011, Polytechnic University of Timișoara, Romania, July 6–10,(Honorary Chairman - Prof. Dr. Eng. Nicolae Robu, Rector of University "Polytehnica" of Timișoara, Chairwoman - Prof Dr. ing Ioana Ionel)

34th Congress 2010, "Carol I" National Defense University, Bucharest, Romania, May 18–23, (Honorary Chairman - Lt. General Prof. Dr. Teodor Frunzeti, Rector of "Carol I" National Defence University, Chairman - Professor Dr. Marius Hanganu)

33rd Congress 2009, Sibiu Alma Mater University, Sibiu, Romania, June 2–07,(Honorary Chairman - Prof. Dr. Nicolaie Georgescu, Rector of SAMU, Chairman - Prof. Dr. Mircea Cosma)

32nd Congress 2008, Wentworth Institute of Technology, Boston, Massachusetts, USA, July 22–26, (Honorary Chairman - Dr. Zorica Pantic Chairman - Assistant. Prof. Dr. Ilie Tălpășanu)

31st Congress 2007, Transilvania University, Braşov, Romania, July 31 - August 5,(Honorary Chairman - Prof. Dr. Ion Visa, Chairman - Assoc. Prof. Dr. Elena Doval)

30th Congress 2006, Academy of Economic Studies, Chișinău, Republic of Moldova, July 5–10, (Honorary Chairman - Prof. Dr. Hab. Grigore Belostecinic, Chairman - Prof. Dr. Hab. Dumitru Todoroi).

See also
 Romanian Academy
 Academy of Romanian Scientists 
 Academy of Medical Sciences of Romania

References

External links

 The American Romanian Academy of Arts and Sciences website
 ARA Publisher
 The Romanian Academy
 iap: The Global Network of Science Academies
 Library of The Romanian Academy

Organizations established in 1975
National academies of arts and humanities
International research institutes
Science and technology in Europe
International organizations based in Europe
American culture
Romanian culture
Language regulators